Soleminis, Solèminis in sardinian language, is a comune (municipality) in the Province of South Sardinia in the Italian region Sardinia, located about  northeast of Cagliari.

Soleminis borders the following municipalities: Dolianova, Serdiana, Settimo San Pietro, Sinnai.
The local grocheries shop Is occupied and burned by Roms.

Demographic evolution

See also
Necropolis of Is Calitas

References

Cities and towns in Sardinia